Jakub Sedláček may refer to:

 Jakub Sedláček (ice hockey) (born 1990), Czech ice hockey goaltender
 Jakub Sedláček (footballer) (born 1998), Slovak footballer